The Springdale Poultry Industry Historic District encompasses a small complex of commercial industrial buildings associated with the poultry industry in Springdale, Arkansas.  Its three buildings included the original headquarters building of Tyson Foods, one of the world's largest producers of chicken meat.  That building, at 319 East Emma Avenue, was built between 1914 and 1924 to house a produce store, and was extensively altered in 1947 to house the Tyson offices.  Immediately adjacent at 317 East Emma is a chicken hatchery, built in 1924 by the Springdale Electric Hatchery Company and renamed the Jeff Brown Hatchery in 1949.  The Tyson Feed Mill building stands behind these at 316 East Meadow.  Jeff Brown was the first president of the Arkansas Poultry Improvement Association.

The district was listed on the National Register of Historic Places in 2011.

See also
National Register of Historic Places listings in Washington County, Arkansas

References

External links

Historic districts on the National Register of Historic Places in Arkansas
Buildings and structures in Springdale, Arkansas
National Register of Historic Places in Washington County, Arkansas
Tyson Foods
Industrial buildings and structures on the National Register of Historic Places in Arkansas
1914 establishments in Arkansas
Industrial buildings completed in 1924
Office buildings on the National Register of Historic Places in Arkansas
Poultry farming in the United States